David Vázquez González (born 12 April 1985 in A Coruña, Galicia), known as Chapi, is a Spanish retired footballer who played as a defender.

Football career
A product of local Deportivo de La Coruña's youth ranks, Chapi appeared once for its first team during his three years as a senior with the club: on 16 December 2007, as the Galicians were coached by Miguel Ángel Lotina, he played 61 minutes against Real Zaragoza, replacing injured Manuel Pablo in a 1–1 home draw.

After failure in negotiations to further his link to Depor, Chapi was released and moved abroad, signing a 1+1 deal with Belgian side S.V. Zulte Waregem. However, unsettled, he returned to his country – and to his region – after just one season, joining lowly SD Compostela.

References

External links

1985 births
Living people
Spanish footballers
Footballers from A Coruña
Association football defenders
La Liga players
Segunda División B players
Tercera División players
Deportivo Fabril players
Deportivo de La Coruña players
SD Compostela footballers
Belgian Pro League players
S.V. Zulte Waregem players
Spanish expatriate footballers
Expatriate footballers in Belgium
Spanish expatriate sportspeople in Belgium